The George Washington Carver-Booker T. Washington Half Dollar was designed by Isaac Scott Hathaway. The obverse depicts side-portraits of George Washington Carver and Booker T. Washington and the reverse shows a simple outline map of the United States of America superimposed with the letters "U.S.A.", and the words "Freedom and Opportunity for All/Americanism" around the rim. It was the final issue of early commemoratives.

History
The bill authorizing the coins was pushed by the George Washington Carver National Monument Foundation, and eventually passed on September 21, 1951, authorizing the mintage of a maximum 3,415,631 coins. This odd maximum mintage number took into consideration the remaining 1,581,631 Booker T. Washington half dollars that could be melted and struck as Washington-Carver coins, with the remainder being based on the 1,834,000 unused quantity earlier authorized for the Booker T. Washington half dollar. Like the Booker T. Washington half dollar, the design for this coin was created by sculptor Isaac Scott Hathaway.

One of the reasons behind the Carver-Washington half dollar may have possibly been to oppose the spread of Communism among African Americans. One of Hathaway's early designs for the coin featured a three quarter profile portrait of Booker T. Washington behind the profile portrait of George Washington Carver on the obverse, while the reverse featured the American Legion seal with inscriptions such as "United Against the Spread of Communism."

The coin would be produced for the following three years. They were often sold in three-coin sets (one coin for each mint mark), although large quantities of the 1951, 1952, 1953-S and 1954-S coins were struck for sale as singles. The sets were sold for between $9 and $10 each, although this would later be raised to $12 per set for the 1954 coins. In 1952, an attempt was made to issue the coins through banks. By the time the program ended in 1954, over a million coins had been distributed.

Aftermath
Despite being the last early commemorative issue, little attention was paid when the program ended in 1954, as by this point most American coin collectors had become bored with commemorative coins. Owing to the fact that the Booker T. Washington and Washington-Carver Halves were little desired at that time, thousands of those coins were returned to the Mint for melting, while thousands more still held by banks were sold to speculators for a small premium (usually pennies) above face value.

Until the George Washington 250th Anniversary Commemorative Half Dollar was issued 28 years later, in 1982, no more commemorative coins would be issued by the United States (not counting the circulating commemorative United States Bicentennial coinage). Any subsequent commemorative coin proposals were met by the Treasury Department with the long list of complaints that had arisen due to past abuses, such as the 1936 commemorative craze.

References

Booker T. Washington
Early United States commemorative coins
Fifty-cent coins
Maps on coins
Half dollar
Currencies introduced in 1951